Alan Cardy (born 19 December 2021) was a representative of  in rugby union. As a young man he concentrated on track and field, winning the Australian Junior Championships discus throw in 1963, aged just seventeen. In 1965, he ran 22.0 seconds in the 220 yards to finish third at the Australian National Championships – one-tenth of a second ahead of Peter Norman, the future silver medallist in the 200 metres at the 1968 Summer Olympics.

Cardy did not play any rugby until 1963 in his final year at Katoomba High School, where he was school captain. He played a few games for the Blue Mountains Rugby Club during 1962 and 1963, and later joined Drummoyne in 1965.

Cardy switched to the other rugby code – rugby league in 1969. However, his wing-threequarters career never reached any great heights in rugby league after suffering a broken leg in the pre-season.

He died on 19 December 2021 at the age of 76, and was survived by his three children.

References

Bibliography

The Encyclopedia Of Rugby League players (Alan Whiticker & Glen Hudson)

20th-century births
2021 deaths
Australia international rugby union players
Australian rugby league players
Australian rugby union players
People from Katoomba, New South Wales
Rugby league players from Katoomba, New South Wales
Rugby union players from New South Wales
Sydney Roosters players
Year of birth missing
Rugby union wings